Cesare Baglioni (c. 1525–1590, born in Bologna) was an Italian painter of the Renaissance period. He trained under his father, then became renowned as a painter of quadratura. He painted in Parma and Rome. He befriended both Agostino and Annibale Carracci.

References

1520s births
1590 deaths
16th-century Italian painters
Italian male painters
Renaissance painters
Quadratura painters